Mishpatim (—Hebrew for "laws," the second word of the parashah) is the eighteenth weekly Torah portion (parashah) in the annual Jewish cycle of Torah reading and the sixth in the Book of Exodus. The parashah sets out a series of laws, which some scholars call the Covenant Code. It reports the people's acceptance of the covenant with God. The parashah constitutes . The parashah is made up of 5,313 Hebrew letters, 1,462 Hebrew words, 118 verses, and 185 lines in a Torah scroll (Sefer Torah).

Jews read it the eighteenth Sabbath after Simchat Torah, generally in February or, rarely, in late January. As the parashah sets out some of the laws of Passover, Jews also read part of the parashah, as the initial Torah reading for the second intermediate day (Chol HaMoed) of Passover. Jews also read the first part of Parashat Ki Tisa, regarding the half-shekel head tax, as the maftir Torah reading on the special Sabbath Shabbat Shekalim, which often falls on the same Sabbath as Parashat Mishpatim (as it does in 2023, 2026, 2028, and 2029).

Readings

First reading—Exodus 21:1–19
In the first reading, "judgments"/"decisions"/"rules"/"laws"/"ordinances" are mentioned, and then are listed concerning Hebrew indentured servants and slaves, homicide, striking a parent, kidnapping, insulting a parent, and assault.

Second reading—Exodus 21:20–22:3
The second reading addresses laws of assault, a homicidal animal, damage to livestock, and theft.

Third reading—Exodus 22:4–26
The third reading addresses laws of damage to crops, bailment, seduction, sorcery, bestiality, apostasy, wronging the disadvantaged, and lending.

Fourth reading—Exodus 22:27–23:5
The fourth reading addresses laws of duties to God, judicial integrity, and humane treatment of an enemy.

Fifth reading—Exodus 23:6–19
The fifth reading addresses laws concerning the disadvantaged, false charges, bribery, oppressing the stranger, the sabbatical year for crops (Shmita), the Sabbath, the mention of other gods, the Three Pilgrimage Festivals (Shalosh Regalim), sacrifice (korban), and First Fruits (Bikkurim).

Sixth reading—Exodus 23:20–25
In the short sixth reading, God promised to send an angel with the Israelites to bring them to the place God had prepared. God directed the Israelites to obey the angel, for if they did, then God would be an enemy to their enemies. The Israelites were not to serve other gods, but to serve only God.

Seventh reading—Exodus 23:26–24:18
In the seventh reading, God promised reward for obedience to God. God invited Moses, Aaron, Nadab, Abihu, and 70 elders to bow to God from afar. Moses repeated the commandments to the people, who answered: "All the things that the Lord has commanded we will do!" Moses then wrote the commandments down. He set up an altar and some young Israelite men offered sacrifices. Moses read the Book of the Covenant aloud to the people, who once again affirmed that they would follow it. Moses took blood from the sacrifices and dashed it on the people. Moses, Aaron, Nadab, Abihu, and the 70 elders of Israel then ascended, saw God, ate, and drank. Moses and Joshua arose, and Moses ascended Mount Sinai, leaving Aaron and Hur in charge. A cloud covered the mountain, hiding the Presence of the Lord for six days, appearing to the Israelites as a fire on the top of the mountain. Moses went inside the cloud and remained on the mountain for 40 days and nights.

Readings according to the triennial cycle
Jews who read the Torah according to the triennial cycle of Torah reading read the parashah according to the following schedule:

In ancient parallels
The parashah has parallels in these ancient sources:

Exodus chapters 21–22
The laws in the parashah find parallels in several ancient law codes.

In inner-biblical interpretation
The parashah has parallels or is discussed in these Biblical sources:

Exodus chapters 21–23

Exodus chapter 21

In three separate places—; ; and —the Torah sets forth the law of "an eye for an eye."

Exodus chapter 22
 admonishes the Israelites not to wrong the stranger, "for you were strangers in the land of Egypt."

 admonishes: "If you take your neighbor's garment in pledge, you must return it to him before the sun sets; it is his only clothing, the sole covering for his skin."

Exodus chapter 23

Passover
 refers to the Festival of Passover. In the Hebrew Bible, Passover is called:
"Passover" (Pesach);
"The Feast of Unleavened Bread" (Chag haMatzot); and
"A holy convocation" or "a solemn assembly" (mikrah kodesh).

Some explain the double nomenclature of "Passover" and "Feast of Unleavened Bread" as referring to two separate feasts that the Israelites combined sometime between the Exodus and when the Biblical text became settled.  and  indicate that the dedication of the firstborn also became associated with the festival.

Some believe that the "Feast of Unleavened Bread" was an agricultural festival at which the Israelites celebrated the beginning of tgrain harvest.

"Passover," on the other hand, was associated with a thanksgiving sacrifice of a lamb, also called "the Passover," "the Passover lamb," or "the Passover offering."

Some believe that the propinquity of the dates of the two Festivals led to their confusion and merger.

 and 27 link the word "Passover" (Pesach) to God's act to "pass over" (pasach) the Israelites' houses in the plague of the firstborn. In the Torah, the consolidated Passover and Feast of Unleavened Bread thus commemorate the Israelites' liberation from Egypt.

The Hebrew Bible frequently notes the Israelites' observance of Passover at turning points in their history.  reports God's direction to the Israelites to observe Passover in the wilderness of Sinai on the anniversary of their liberation from Egypt.  reports that upon entering the Promised Land, the Israelites kept the Passover on the plains of Jericho and ate unleavened cakes and parched grain, produce of the land, the next day.  reports that King Josiah commanded the Israelites to keep the Passover in Jerusalem as part of Josiah's reforms, but also notes that the Israelites had not kept such a Passover from the days of the Biblical judges nor in all the days of the kings of Israel or the kings of Judah, calling into question the observance of even Kings David and Solomon. The more reverent , however, reports that Solomon offered sacrifices on the Festivals, including the Feast of Unleavened Bread. And  reports King Hezekiah's observance of a second Passover anew, as sufficient numbers of neither the priests nor the people were prepared to do so before then. And  reports that the Israelites returned from the Babylonian captivity observed Passover, ate the Passover lamb, and kept the Feast of Unleavened Bread seven days with joy.

Shavuot
 refers to the Festival of Shavuot. In the Hebrew Bible, Shavuot is called:
The Feast of Weeks (Chag Shavuot);
The Day of the First-fruits (Yom haBikurim);
The Feast of Harvest (Chag haKatzir); and
A holy convocation (mikrah kodesh).

 associates Shavuot with the first-fruits (bikurei) of the wheat harvest. In turn,  set out the ceremony for the bringing of the first fruits.

To arrive at the correct date,  instructs counting seven weeks from the day after the day of rest of Passover, the day that they brought the sheaf of barley for waving. Similarly,  directs counting seven weeks from when they first put the sickle to the standing barley.

 sets out a course of offerings for the fiftieth day, including a meal-offering of two loaves made from fine flour from the first-fruits of the harvest; burnt-offerings of seven lambs, one bullock, and two rams; a sin-offering of a goat; and a peace-offering of two lambs. Similarly,  sets out a course of offerings including a meal-offering; burnt-offerings of two bullocks, one ram, and seven lambs; and one goat to make atonement.  directs a freewill-offering in relation to God's blessing.

 and  ordain a holy convocation in which the Israelites were not to work.

 reports that Solomon offered burnt-offerings on the Feast of Weeks.

Sukkot
And  refers to the Festival of Sukkot. In the Hebrew Bible, Sukkot is called:
"The Feast of Tabernacles (or Booths)";
"The Feast of Ingathering";
"The Feast" or "the festival";
"The Feast of the Lord";
"The festival of the seventh month"; and
"A holy convocation" or "a sacred occasion."

Sukkot's agricultural origin is evident from the name "The Feast of Ingathering," from the ceremonies accompanying it, and from the season and occasion of its celebration: "At the end of the year when you gather in your labors out of the field"; "after you have gathered in from your threshing-floor and from your winepress." It was a thanksgiving for the fruit harvest. And in what may explain the festival's name, Isaiah reports that grape harvesters kept booths in their vineyards. Coming as it did at the completion of the harvest, Sukkot was regarded as a general thanksgiving for the bounty of nature in the year that had passed.

Sukkot became one of the most important feasts in Judaism, as indicated by its designation as "the Feast of the Lord" or simply "the Feast." Perhaps because of its wide attendance, Sukkot became the appropriate time for important state ceremonies. Moses instructed the children of Israel to gather for a reading of the Law during Sukkot every seventh year. King Solomon dedicated the Temple in Jerusalem on Sukkot. And Sukkot was the first sacred occasion observed after the resumption of sacrifices in Jerusalem after the Babylonian captivity.

In the time of Nehemiah, after the Babylonian captivity, the Israelites celebrated Sukkot by making and dwelling in booths, a practice of which Nehemiah reports: "the Israelites had not done so from the days of Joshua." In a practice related to that of the Four Species, Nehemiah also reports that the Israelites found in the Law the commandment that they "go out to the mountains and bring leafy branches of olive trees, pine trees, myrtles, palms and [other] leafy trees to make booths." In , God told Moses to command the people: "On the first day you shall take the product of hadar trees, branches of palm trees, boughs of leafy trees, and willows of the brook," and "You shall live in booths seven days; all citizens in Israel shall live in booths, in order that future generations may know that I made the Israelite people live in booths when I brought them out of the land of Egypt." The book of Numbers, however, indicates that while in the wilderness, the Israelites dwelt in tents. Some scholars consider  (the commandments regarding booths and the four species) to be an insertion by a late redactor.

Jeroboam son of Nebat, King of the northern Kingdom of Israel, whom  describes as practicing "his evil way," celebrated a festival on the fifteenth day of the eighth month, one month after Sukkot, "in imitation of the festival in Judah." "While Jeroboam was standing on the altar to present the offering, the man of God, at the command of the Lord, cried out against the altar" in disapproval.

According to Zechariah, in the messianic era, Sukkot will become a universal festival, and all nations will make pilgrimages annually to Jerusalem to celebrate the feast there.

Milk

Stone pillars
In , Jacob took the stone on which he had slept, set it up as a pillar (matzeivah), and poured oil on the top of it.  would later direct the Israelites to break in pieces the Canaanites' pillars (matzeivoteihem).  would direct the Israelites not to rear up a pillar (matzeivah). And  would prohibit them to set up a pillar (tzevahma), "which the Lord your God hates."

In early nonrabbinic interpretation
The parashah has parallels or is discussed in these early nonrabbinic sources:

Exodus chapter 22
The Damascus Document of the Qumran community prohibited non-cash transactions with Jews who were not members of the community. Apparently, the Qumran community viewed prevailing methods of conducting business through credit to violate those laws.

Exodus chapter 23
One of the Dead Sea Scrolls, the Community Rule of the Qumran sectarians, cited , "Keep far from a deceitful matter," to support a prohibition of business partnerships with people outside of the group.

In classical rabbinic interpretation
The parashah is discussed in these rabbinic sources from the era of the Mishnah and the Talmud:

Exodus chapter 21
Rabbi Akiva deduced from the words "now these are the ordinances that you shall put before them" in  that the teacher must wherever possible explain to the student the reasons behind the commandments.

The Mishnah taught that a Hebrew manservant (described in ) was acquired by money or by contract, and could acquire his freedom by years of service, by the Jubilee year, or by deduction from the purchase price. The Mishnah taught that a Hebrew maidservant was more privileged in that she could acquire her freedom by signs of puberty. The servant whose ear was bored (as directed in ) is acquired by boring his ear, and acquired his freedom by the Jubilee year or the master's death.

The Rabbis taught in a Baraita that the words of  regarding the Hebrew servant, "he fares well with you," indicate that the Hebrew servant had to be "with"—that is, equal to—the master in food and drink. Thus the master could not eat white bread and have the servant eat black bread. The master could not drink old wine and have the servant drink new wine. The master could not sleep on a feather bed and have the servant sleep on straw. Hence, they said that buying a Hebrew servant was like buying a master.

The Gemara read  to address a Hebrew slave who married the Master's Canaanite slave. The Gemara thus deduced from  that the children of such a marriage were also considered Canaanite slaves and thus that their lineage flowed from their mother, not their father. Further interpreting , the Gemara noted that the Canaanite slave woman nonetheless had an obligation to observe certain commandments.

Rabbi Eleazar reasoned that because  uses the term "ear" (in connection with the slave who refused to go out free) and  also uses the term "ear" (in connection with the purification ritual for one with skin disease), just as  explicitly requires using the right ear of the one to be cleansed, so  must also require using the slave's right ear.

Rabbi Simeon bar Rabbi explained that God singled out the doorpost from all other parts of the house because the doorpost was witness in Egypt when God passed over the lintel and the doorposts (as reported in ) and proclaimed (in the words of ), "For to me the children of Israel are servants, they are my servants," and not servants of servants, and so God brought them forth from bondage to freedom, yet this servant acquired a master for himself.

The Mishnah taught that those who killed in error went into banishment. One would go into banishment if, for example, while one was pushing a roller on a roof, the roller slipped over, fell, and killed someone. One would go into banishment if while one was lowering a cask, it fell down and killed someone. One would go into banishment if while coming down a ladder, one fell and killed someone. But one would not go into banishment if while pulling up the roller it fell back and killed someone, or while raising a bucket the rope snapped and the falling bucket killed someone, or while going up a ladder one fell down and killed someone. The Mishnah's general principle was that whenever the death occurred in the course of a downward movement, the culpable person went into banishment, but if the death did not occur in the course of a downward movement, the person did not go into banishment. If while chopping wood, the iron slipped from the ax handle and killed someone, Rabbi taught that the person did not go into banishment, but the sages said that the person did go into banishment. If from the split log rebounding killed someone, Rabbi said that the person went into banishment, but the sages said that the person did not go into banishment.

Rabbi Jose bar Judah taught that to begin with, they sent a slayer to a city of refuge, whether the slayer killed intentionally or not. Then the court sent and brought the slayer back from the city of refuge. The Court executed whomever the court found guilty of a capital crime, and the court acquitted whomever the court found not guilty of a capital crime. The court restored to the city of refuge whomever the court found liable to banishment, as  ordained, "And the congregation shall restore him to the city of refuge from where he had fled."  also says, "The manslayer . . . shall dwell therein until the death of the high priest, who was anointed with the holy oil," but the Mishnah taught that the death of a high priest who had been anointed with the holy anointing oil, the death of a high priest who had been consecrated by the many vestments, or the death of a high priest who had retired from his office each equally made possible the return of the slayer. Rabbi Judah said that the death of a priest who had been anointed for war also permitted the return of the slayer. Because of these laws, mothers of high priests would provide food and clothing for the slayers in cities of refuge so that the slayers might not pray for the high priest's death. If the high priest died at the conclusion of the slayer's trial, the slayer did not go into banishment. If, however, the high priests died before the trial was concluded and another high priest was appointed in his stead and then the trial concluded, the slayer returned home after the new high priest's death.

Rabbi Akiva cited , in which the duty to punish an intentional murderer takes precedence over the sanctity of the altar, to support the proposition that the avoidance of danger to human life takes precedence over the laws of the Sabbath. Thus, if a murderer came as priest to do the Temple service, one could take him away from the precincts of the altar. And Rabbah bar bar Hana taught in the name of Rabbi Johanan that to save life—for example, if a priest could testify to the innocence of a defendant—one could take a priest down from the altar even while he was performing the Temple service. Now if this is so, even where doubt existed whether there was any substance to the priest's testimony, yet one interrupted the Temple service, and the Temple service was important enough to suspend the Sabbath, how much more should the saving of human life suspend the Sabbath laws.

Similarly, the Gemara reasoned that just as the Temple service—which was of high importance and superseded the Sabbath, as labor prohibited on the Sabbath could be performed in connection with the Temple service—could itself be superseded by the requirement to carry out a death sentence for murder, as  says, "You shall take him from My altar, that he may die," how much more reasonable is it that the Sabbath, which is superseded by the Temple service, should be superseded by the requirement to carry out a death sentence for murder?

Noting that  commands, "He that curses his father or his mother shall surely be put to death," and  commands, "Whoever curses his God shall bear his sin," the Rabbis taught in a Baraita that Scripture likens cursing parents to cursing God. As  (20:12 in NJSP) commands, "Honor your father and your mother," and  directs, "Honor the Lord with your substance," Scripture likens the honor due to parents to that due to God. And as  commands, "You shall fear your father and mother," and  commands, "The Lord your God you shall fear and you shall serve," Scripture likens the fear of parents to the fear of God. But the Baraita conceded that with respect to striking (which  addresses with regard to parents), that it is certainly impossible (with respect to God). The Baraita concluded that these comparisons between parents and God are only logical, since the three (God, the mother, and the father) are partners in creation of the child. For the Rabbis taught in a Baraita that there are three partners in the creation of a person—God, the father, and the mother. When one honors one's father and mother, God considers it as if God had dwelt among them and they had honored God. And a Tanna taught before Rav Nachman that when one vexes one's father and mother, God considers it right not to dwell among them, for had God dwelt among them, they would have vexed God.

Rav Aha taught that people have no power to bring about healing (and thus one should not practice medicine, but leave healing to God).

The Gemara taught that the words "eye for eye" in  meant pecuniary compensation. Rabbi Simon ben Yohai asked those who would take the words literally how they would enforce equal justice where a blind man put out the eye of another man, or an amputee cut off the hand of another, or where a lame person broke the leg of another. Abaye reported that a sage of the school of Hezekiah taught that  said "eye for eye" and "life for life," but not "life and eye for eye," and it could sometimes happen that eye and life would be taken for an eye, as when the offender died while being blinded. Rav Papa said in the name of Rava (Abba ben Joseph bar Ḥama) that  referred explicitly to healing, and the verse would not make sense if one assumed that retaliation was meant. As the latter case plainly indicated pecuniary compensation, so must the former.

The Mishnah taught that Scripture deals with four principal causes of damage: (1) the ox (in ), (2) the pit (in ), (3) the crop-destroying beast (in ), and (4) the fire (in ). The Mishnah taught that although they differed in some respects, they had in common that they are in the habit of doing damage, and they have to be under their owner's control so that whenever one of them does damage, the owner is liable to indemnify with the best of the owner's estate (when money is not tendered). The Rabbis taught in a Baraita that Scripture identifies three principal categories of damage by the ox: (1) by the horn (in ), (2) by the tooth (in ), and (3) by the foot (also in ).

Noting that  provides a penalty of five oxen for the theft of an ox but only four sheep for the theft of a sheep, Rabbi Meir deduced that the law attaches great importance to labor. For in the case of an ox, a thief interferes with the beast's labor, while in the case of a sheep, a thief does not disturb it from labor. Rabban Johanan ben Zakkai taught that the law attaches great importance to human dignity. For in the case of an ox, the thief can walk the animal away on its own feet, while in the case of a sheep, the thief usually has to carry it away, thus suffering indignity.

Exodus chapter 22
Rabbi Ishmael cited , in which the right to defend one's home at night takes precedence over the prohibition of killing, to support the proposition that the avoidance of danger to human life takes precedence over the laws of the Sabbath. So even if in the case of the thief—where doubt exists whether the thief came to take money or life, and even though  teaches that the shedding of blood pollutes the land, so that the Divine Presence departs from Israel—yet it was lawful to save oneself at the cost of the thief's life, how much more may one suspend the laws of the Sabbath to save human life.

Rabbi Ishmael read  to require the damager to compensate the injured party out of property equivalent to the injured party's best property, whereas Rabbi Akiba read  to require the damager to compensate the injured party out of the damager's best property. The Mishnah required that a damager compensates for damage done out of the damager's best quality property. The Gemara explained that the Mishnah imposed this high penalty because  requires it, and  imposes this penalty to discourage the doing of damage.

Rabbi Isaac the smith interpreted  homiletically to teach that God has taken responsibility to rebuild the Temple, as God allowed the fire of man's sin to go out of Zion to destroy it, as  reports, "He has kindled a fire in Zion, which has devoured the foundations thereof," and God will nonetheless rebuild them, as  reports, "For I, says the Lord, will be to her a wall of fire round about, and I will be the glory in the midst of her."

The Mishnah identified four categories of guardians (shomrim): (1) an unpaid custodian, (2) a borrower, (3) a paid custodian, and (4) a renter. The Mishnah summarized the law when damage befell the property in question: An unpaid custodian must swear for everything and bears no liability, a borrower must pay in all cases, a paid custodian or a renter must swear concerning an animal that was injured, captured, or died, but must pay for loss or theft.

Rabbah explained that the Torah in  requires those who admit to a part of a claim against them to take an oath, because the law presumes that no debtor is so brazen in the face of a creditor as to deny the debt entirely.

Rabbi Haninah and Rabbi Johanan differed over whether sorcery like that in  had real power.

Rabbi Eliezer the Great taught that the Torah warns against wronging a stranger (ger) in 36, or others say 46, places (including  and ). A Baraita reported that Rabbi Nathan taught that one should not mention in another a defect that one has oneself. Thus, since the Jewish people were themselves strangers, they should not demean a convert because he is a stranger in their midst. And this explains the adage that one who has a person hanged in his family, does not say to another member of his household: Hang a fish for me, as the mention of hanging is demeaning for that family.

Citing  to apply to verbal wrongs, the Mishnah taught that one must not say to a repentant sinner, "remember your former deeds," and one must not taunt a child of converts saying, "remember the deeds of your ancestors." Similarly, a Baraita taught that one must not say to a convert who comes to study the Torah, "Shall the mouth that ate unclean and forbidden food, abominable and creeping things, come to study the Torah that was uttered by the mouth of Omnipotence!"

Elsewhere, the Mishnah drew from  that money in exchange for a firstborn donkey could be given to any Kohen; that if a person weaves the hair of a firstborn donkey into a sack, the sack must be burned; that they did not redeem with the firstborn of a donkey an animal that falls within both wild and domestic categories (a koy); and that one was prohibited to derive benefit in any quantity at all from an unredeemed firstborn donkey. And elsewhere, the Mishnah taught that before the Israelites constructed the Tabernacle, the firstborns performed sacrificial services, but after the Israelites constructed the Tabernacle, the Priests (Kohanim) performed the services.

Exodus chapter 23
In the Babylonian Talmud, the Gemara read , "You shall not follow a multitude to do evil," to support the rule that when a court tried a non-capital case, the decision of the majority of the judges determined the outcome.

A Baraita taught that one day, Rabbi Eliezer employed every imaginable argument for the proposition that a particular type of oven was not susceptible to ritual impurity, but the Sages did not accept his arguments. Then Rabbi Eliezer told the Sages, "If the halachah agrees with me, then let this carob tree prove it," and the carob tree moved 100 cubits (and others say 400 cubits) out of its place. But the Sages said that no proof can be brought from a carob tree. Then Rabbi Eliezer told the Sages, "If the halachah agrees with me, let this stream of water prove it," and the stream of water flowed backwards. But the Sages said that no proof can be brought from a stream of water. Then Rabbi Eliezer told the Sages, "If the halachah agrees with me, let the walls of this house of study prove it," and the walls leaned over as if to fall. But Rabbi Joshua rebuked the walls, telling them not to interfere with scholars engaged in a halachic dispute. In honor of Rabbi Joshua, the walls did not fall, but in honor of Rabbi Eliezer, the walls did not stand upright, either. Then Rabbi Eliezer told the Sages, "If the halachah agrees with me, let Heaven prove it," and a Heavenly Voice cried out: "Why do you dispute with Rabbi Eliezer, for in all matters the halachah agrees with him!" But Rabbi Joshua rose and exclaimed in the words of  "It is not in heaven." Rabbi Jeremiah explained that God had given the Torah at Mount Sinai; Jews pay no attention to Heavenly Voices, for God wrote in  "After the majority must one incline." Later, Rabbi Nathan met Elijah and asked him what God did when Rabbi Joshua rose in opposition to the Heavenly Voice. Elijah replied that God laughed with joy, saying, "My children have defeated Me, My children have defeated Me!"

Rav Aḥa bar Pappa cited , "Neither shall you answer in a cause (riv)," to support the rule of Mishnah Sanhedrin 4:2 that in capital cases, the judges began issuing their opinions from the side, where the least significant judges sat. The Sages interpreted  to read, "Neither shall you answer after the Master (rav), that is: Do not dispute the opinion of the greatest among the judges. Were the judges to begin issuing their opinions from the greatest to the least among the judges, and the greatest would find the accused guilty, no judge would acquit the accused. Thus to encourage the lesser judges to speak freely in capital cases, the Mishnah's rule had them speak first.

If the owner sat down and said, "Since the commandment is on you, if you wish to unload, unload," one was not obligated, for  says "with him." But if the owner was aged or sick, one was obligated to lift even without the owner's help. But Rabbi Simeon said that  required the passer-by to load it too. Rabbi Jose the Galilean said that if the animal bore more than its proper burden, then the passer-by had no obligation towards the owner, because  says, "If you see the donkey of him who hates you lying under its burden," which means, a burden under which it can stand. The Gemara concluded that  and  require people to prevent suffering to animals. And the Gemara argued that when the Mishnah exempts the passerby when the owner does not participate in unloading the burden, it means that the passerby is exempt from unloading the burden for free, but is obligated to do so for remuneration.

Rabbi Samuel bar Rav Isaac said that Rav said that one is permitted to hate another whom one sees committing a sin, as  states: "If you see the donkey of he who hates you lying under its load." But the Gemara asked whether one is permitted to hate one’s fellow, as  says, “You shall not hate your brother in your heart,” which prohibits hating one’s fellow. The Gemara concluded that one is permitted to hate another for evil behavior one sees, whereas others who are unaware of these actions may not hate the other. Rav Naḥman bar Isaac said: Not only is this permitted, it is even a commandment to hate this other person, as  states: "The fear of God is to hate evil."

Rav Aḥa bar Pappa read , "You shall not incline the judgment of your poor in his cause," to teach that a court could not convict one accused of a capital crime (the "poor" person to whom Rav Aḥa read the verse to refer) by just a simple one-vote majority. Rav Aḥa's thus read  to make it harder for a court to convict one accused of a capital crime.

The Mishnah interpreted  to teach that judges who accept bribes and change their judgments on account of the bribe will not die of old age before their eyes grow weak.

A Baraita reasoned that , "And you shall take no bribe," cannot teach merely that one should not acquit the guilty nor convict the innocent due to a bribe, for  already says, "You shall not wrest judgment." Rather,  teaches that even if a bribe is given to ensure that a judge acquit the innocent and convict the guilty,  nevertheless says, "And you shall take no bribe." Thus it is prohibited for a judge to receive anything from litigants, even if there is no concern at all that justice will be perverted.

Rava taught that the reason for the prohibition against taking a bribe is that once a judge accepts a bribe from a party, the judge's thoughts draw closer to the party and the party becomes like the judge's own self, and one does not find fault with oneself. The Gemara noted that the term "bribe" (shochad) alludes to this idea, as it can be read as "as he is one" (shehu chad), that is, the judge is at one mind with the litigant. Rav Papa taught that judges should not judge cases involving those whom the judge loves (as the judge will not find any fault in them), nor involving those whom the judge hates (as the judge will not find any merit in them).

The Sages taught that it is not necessary to say that  precludes bribery by means of money, and even verbal bribery is also prohibited. The law that a bribe is not necessarily monetary was be derived from the fact that  does not say: "And you shall take no profit." The Gemara illustrated this by telling how Samuel was once crossing a river on a ferry and a certain man gave him a hand to help him out of the ferryboat. Samuel asked him what he was doing in the place, and when the man told Samuel that he had a case to present before Samuel, Samuel told him that he was disqualified from presiding over the case, as the man did Samuel a favor, and although no money changed hands, a bond had been formed between them. Similarly, the Gemara told that Ameimar disqualified himself from presiding over the case of a person who removed a feather from Ameimar's head, and Mar Ukva disqualified himself from presiding over the case of a person who covered spittle that was lying before Mar Ukva.

The Midrash taught that God loves those who love God, and thus God loves the righteous, because their worth is due neither to heritage nor to family. The Midrash compared God's great love of converts to a king who had a flock of goats, and once a stag came in with the flock. When the king was told that the stag had joined the flock, the king felt an affection for the stag and gave orders that the stag have good pasture and drink and that no one beat him. When the king's servants asked him why he protected the stag, the king explained that the flock have no choice, but the stag did. The king accounted it as a merit to the stag that had left behind the whole of the broad, vast wilderness, the abode of all the beasts, and had come to stay in the courtyard. In like manner, God provided converts with special protection, for God exhorted Israel not to harm them, as  says, "Love therefore the convert," and  says, "And a convert shall you not oppress."

The Mishnah asked until when a field with trees could be plowed in the sixth year. The House of Shammai said as long as such work would benefit fruit that would ripen in the sixth year. But the House of Hillel said until Shavuot. The Mishnah observed that in reality, the views of two schools approximate each other. The Mishnah taught that one could plow a grain-field in the sixth year until the moisture had dried up in the soil (that it, after Passover, when rains in the Land of Israel cease) or as long as people still plowed in order to plant cucumbers and gourds (which need a great deal of moisture). Rabbi Simeon objected that if that were the rule, then we would place the law in the hands of each person to decide. But the Mishnah concluded that the prescribed period in the case of a grain-field was until Passover, and in the case of a field with trees, until Shavuot. But Rabban Gamaliel and his court ordained that working the land was permitted until the New Year that began the seventh year. Thus, just as in the case of the Sabbath Day, work is forbidden on the day itself, but allowed on the day before and the day after, so likewise in the Sabbath Year, tillage is forbidden during the year itself, but allowed in the year before and the year after.

Rabbi Isaac taught that the words of Psalm , "mighty in strength that fulfill His word," speak of those who observe the Sabbatical year. Rabbi Isaac said that we often find that a person fulfills a precept for a day, a week, or a month, but it is remarkable to find one who does so for an entire year. Rabbi Isaac asked whether one could find a mightier person than one who sees his field untilled, see his vineyard untilled, and yet pays his taxes and does not complain. And Rabbi Isaac noted that  uses the words "that fulfill His word (devaro)," and  says regarding observance of the Sabbatical year, "And this is the manner (devar) of the release," and argued that , devar means the observance of the Sabbatical year in both places.

A Midrash asked to which commandment  refers when it says, "For if you shall diligently keep all this commandment that I command you, to do it, to love the Lord your God, to walk in all His ways, and to cleave to Him, then will the Lord drive out all these nations from before you, and you shall dispossess nations greater and mightier than yourselves." Rabbi Levi said that "this commandment" refers to the recitation of the Shema, but the Rabbis said that it refers to the Sabbath, which is equal to all the precepts of the Torah.

The Alphabet of Rabbi Akiva taught that when God was giving Israel the Torah, God told them that if they accepted the Torah and observed God's commandments, then God would give them for eternity a most precious thing that God possessed—the World To Come. When Israel asked to see in this world an example of the World To Come, God replied that the Sabbath is an example of the World To Come.

A Baraita deduced from the words "that they may hear" in  that a deaf person was not required to appear at the assembly. And the Baraita deduced from the words "that they may learn" in  that a mute person was not required to appear at the assembly. But the Gemara questioned the conclusion that one who cannot talk cannot learn, recounting the story of two mute grandsons (or others say nephews) of Rabbi Johanan ben Gudgada who lived in Rabbi's neighborhood. Rabbi prayed for them, and they were healed. And it turned out that notwithstanding their speech impediment, they had learned halachah, Sifra, Sifre, and the whole Talmud. Rabbi Tanhum deduced from the words "in their ears" (using the plural for "ears") at the end of  that one who was deaf in one ear was exempt from appearing at the assembly.

The Mishnah taught that the prohibitions of  that "seven days shall there be no leaven found in your houses" and of  that "no leaven shall be seen in all your territory" applied to the first Passover; while at the second Passover, one could have both leavened and unleavened bread in one's house. And the Mishnah taught that for the first Passover, one was required to recite the Hallel when the Passover lamb was eaten; while the second Passover did not require the reciting of Hallel when the Passover lamb was eaten. But both the first and second Passovers required the reciting of Hallel when the Passover lambs were offered, and both Passover lambs were eaten roasted with unleavened bread and bitter herbs. And both the first and second Passovers took precedence over the Sabbath.

The Gemara cited  to support the proposition, which both Resh Lakish and Rabbi Johanan held, that on the mid-festival days (Chol HaMoed) it is forbidden to work. For the Rabbis taught in a Baraita the view of Rabbi Josiah that because the word "keep" is read to imply prohibition of work, the words, "The Feast of Unleavened Bread shall you keep, seven days," in  teach that work is forbidden for seven days, and thus work is forbidden on the mid-festival days.

Resh Lakish argued that  taught that whenever a pilgrim appeared at the Temple, even during the succeeding days of a multi-day Festival, the pilgrim had to bring an offering. But Rabbi Johanan argued that  refers to only the first day of a Festival, and not to succeeding days. After relating this dispute, the Gemara reconsidered and concluded that Resh Lakish and Rabbi Johanan differed not over whether additional offerings were obligatory, but over whether additional offerings were permitted.

The Mishnah taught that a sukkah can be no more than 20 cubits high. Rabbi Judah, however, declared taller sukkot valid. The Mishnah taught that a sukkah must be at least 10 handbreadths high, have three walls, and have more shade than sun. The House of Shammai declared invalid a sukkah made 30 days or more before the festival, but the House of Hillel pronounced it valid. The Mishnah taught that if one made the sukkah for the purpose of the festival, even at the beginning of the year, it is valid.

The Mishnah taught that a sukkah under a tree is as invalid as a sukkah within a house. If one sukkah is erected above another, the upper one is valid, but the lower is invalid. Rabbi Judah said that if there are no occupants in the upper one, then the lower one is valid.

It invalidates a sukkah to spread a sheet over the sukkah because of the sun, or beneath it because of falling leaves, or over the frame of a four-post bed. One may spread a sheet, however, over the frame of a two-post bed.

It is not valid to train a vine, gourd, or ivy to cover a sukkah and then cover it with sukkah covering (s'chach). If, however, the sukkah-covering exceeds the vine, gourd, or ivy in quantity, or if the vine, gourd, or ivy is detached, it is valid. The general rule is that one may not use for sukkah-covering anything that is susceptible to ritual impurity (tumah) or that does not grow from the soil. But one may use for sukkah-covering anything not susceptible to ritual impurity that grows from the soil.

Bundles of straw, wood, or brushwood may not serve as sukkah-covering. But any of them, if they are untied, are valid. All materials are valid for the walls.

Rabbi Judah taught that one may use planks for the sukkah-covering, but Rabbi Meir taught that one may not. The Mishnah taught that it is valid to place a plank four handbreadths wide over the sukkah, provided that one does not sleep under it.

The Mishnah deduced from the words "the feast of harvest, the first-fruits of your labors, which you sow in the field" in  that first fruits were not to be brought before Shavuot.

The Mishnah thus taught that people who planted trees but bent their branches into or over another's property could not bring first fruits from those trees. And for the same reason, the Mishnah taught that tenants, lessees, occupiers of confiscated property, or robbers could not bring first fruits.

Rav Nahman warned that one who is as skilled in refuting heretics as Rav Idit should do so, but others should not. Once a heretic asked Rav Idit why  says, "And to Moses He said, 'Come up to the Lord,'" when surely God should have said, "Come up to Me." But if so, the heretic retorted, we should worship Metatron. Rav Idit replied that  also says, "Be not rebellious against him," by which God meant, "Do not exchange Me for him" (as the word for "rebel," (tameir) derives from the same root as the word "exchange"). The heretic then asked why then  says, "he will not pardon your transgression." Rav Idit answered that indeed Metatron has no authority to forgive sins, and the Israelites would not accept him even as a messenger, for  reports that Moses told God, "If Your Presence does not go with me, do not carry us up from here."

The Midrash Tanhuma taught that the words "the place which I have prepared" in  indicate that the Temple in Jerusalem is directly opposite the Temple in Heaven.

Manasseh argued that when (as reported in ) Moses quoted God saying, "The number of your days I will fulfill," God meant that God would allow people to live out their appointed lifespan, but not add to it. But Manasseh noted that Isaiah told Manasseh's father Hezekiah (as reported in ) that God promised Hezekiah, "I will add on to your days fifteen years." According to Rava, Isaiah did not dispute Manasseh's charges, knowing that Manasseh would not accept Isaiah's argument, no matter how truthful, and Manasseh had Isaiah killed. A Baraita taught that "the number of your days I will fulfill" refers to the lifespan that God allots to every human being at birth. Rabbi Akiba taught that if one is worthy, God allows one to complete the full period; if unworthy, God reduces the number of years. The Sages, however, taught that if one is worthy, God adds years to one's life; if one is unworthy, God reduces the years. Rabbi Akiba replied that God made the addition to Hezekiah's lifespan from years that God had originally intended for Hezekiah that Hezekiah had previously lost due to sin. Rabbi Akiba cited in support of his position the words of the prophet in the days of Jeroboam, before the birth of Hezekiah, who prophesied (as reported in ), "a son shall be born to the house of David, Josiah by name." Rabbi Akiba argued that since the prophet prophesied the birth of Manasseh's son Josiah before the birth of Manasseh's father Hezekiah, it must be that at Hezekiah's birth God had allotted to Hezekiah enough years to extend beyond the time of Hezekiah's illness (when Isaiah prophesied in ) so as to include the year of Manasseh's birth. Consequently, Rabbi Akiba argued, at the time of Hezekiah's illness, God must have reduced the original number of years allotted to Hezekiah, and upon Hezekiah's recovery, God must have added back only that which God had previously reduced. The Rabbis, however, argued back that the prophet in the days of Jeroboam who prophesied in  did not prophesy that Josiah would necessarily descend from Hezekiah. The prophet prophesied in  that Josiah would be born "to the house of David." Thus Josiah might have descended either from Hezekiah or from some other person in the Davidic line.

And the words, "till Your people pass over, O Lord," in  allude to the first advance of the Israelites into the Promised Land in the days of Joshua. And the words, "till the people pass over whom You have gotten," in  allude to the second advance of the Israelites into the Promised Land in the days of Ezra. The Baraita thus concluded that the Israelites were worthy that God should perform a miracle on their behalf during the second advance as in the first advance, but that did not happen because the Israelites' sin caused God to withhold the miracle.

But a Baraita taught that the hornet did not pass over the Jordan River with the Israelites. Rabbi Simeon ben Lakish reconciled the two sources, explaining that the hornet stood on the eastern bank of the Jordan and shot its venom over the river at the Canaanites. The venom blinded the Canaanites' eyes above and castrated them below, as  says, "Yet destroyed I the Amorite before them, whose height was like the height of the cedars, and he was strong as the oaks; yet I destroyed his fruit from above and his roots from beneath." Rav Papa offered an alternative explanation, saying that there were two hornets, one in the time of Moses and the other in the time of Joshua. The former did not pass over the Jordan, but the latter did.

Exodus chapter 24
Rav Huna son of Rav Kattina sat before Rav Chisda, and Rav Chisda cited , "And he sent the young men of the children of Israel, who offered burnt-offerings, and sacrificed peace-offerings of oxen to the Lord," as an application of the proposition stated in the Mishnah that "before the Tabernacle was set up . . . the service was performed by the firstborn; after the tabernacle was set up . . . the service was performed by priests." Rav Huna replied to Rav Chisda that Rabbi Assi taught that after that the firstborn ceased performing the sacrificial service (even though it was nearly a year before the Tabernacle was set up).

It was taught in a Baraita that King Ptolemy brought together 72 elders and placed them in 72 separate rooms, without telling them why he had brought them together, and asked each of them to translate the Torah.

Rabbi Isaac taught that when a king administers an oath to his legions, he does so with a sword, implying that whoever transgressed the oath would have the sword pass over his neck. Similarly, at Sinai, as  reports, "Moses took half of the blood" (thus adjuring them with the blood). The Midrash asked how Moses knew how much was half of the blood. Rabbi Judah bar Ila'i taught that the blood divided itself into halves on its own. Rabbi Nathan said that its appearance changed; half of it turned black, and half remained red. Bar Kappara told that an angel in the likeness of Moses came down and divided it. Rabbi Isaac taught that a Heavenly Voice came from Mount Horeb, saying that this much is half of the blood. Rabbi Ishmael taught in a Baraita that Moses was expert in the regulations relating to blood, and by means of that knowledge divided it.  goes on to say, "And he put it in basins (aganot)." Rav Huna said in the name of Rabbi Avin that  writes the word in a form that might be read aganat ("basin," singular) indicating that neither basin was larger than the other. Moses asked God what to do with God's portion. God told Moses to sprinkle it on the people. ( reports, "And Moses took the blood, and sprinkled it on the people.") Moses asked what he should do with the Israelites' portion. God said to sprinkle it on the altar, as  says, "And half of the blood he dashed against the altar."

Reading  "And he took the book of the covenant, and read in the hearing of the people," the Mekhilta asked what Moses had read. Rabbi said that Moses read to them the laws commanded to Adam, the commandments given to the Israelites in Egypt and at Marah, and all other commandments that they had already been given. The Israelites said that they accepted all those.

Even before they had heard the Torah, they answered God that they would keep and observe all the precepts that are in the Torah, as  reports, "And they said, 'All that the Lord has spoken will we do, and be obedient.'"

Rabbi Phineas taught that it was on the eve of the Sabbath that the Israelites stood at Mount Sinai, arranged with the men apart and the women apart. God told Moses to ask the women whether they wished to receive the Torah. Moses asked the women first, because the way of men is to follow the opinion of women, as  reflects when it says, "Thus shall you say to the house of Jacob"—these are the women—and only thereafter does  say, "And tell the children of Israel"—these are the men.

Rabbi Eleazar taught that when the Israelites gave precedence to "we will do" over "we will hear," a Heavenly Voice called out that this was a secret employed by the Ministering Angels, as  says, "Bless the Lord, you angels of His. You mighty in strength, who fulfill His word, who hear the voice of His word"—first they fulfill, then they hear.

Rabbi Hama son of Rabbi Haninah taught that Song of Songs  compared the Israelites to an apple tree with the words, "As the apple tree among the trees of the wood, so is my beloved among the sons." Rabbi Hama explained that this teaches that just as the fruit of the apple tree precedes its leaves, so did the Israelites give precedence to "we will do" over "we will hear."

When a certain Sadducee saw Rava so engrossed in his studies with his fingers under his feet that Rava ground his fingers so that they bled, the Sadducee exclaimed that Jews were a rash people who in  had given precedence to their mouth over their ears, and who persist in their rashness. First, the Sadducee explained, the Israelites should have listened, and then they should have accepted the law only if obeying the commandments was within their powers, but if it was not within their powers, they should not have accepted. Rava replied that the Israelites walked in integrity, for  speaks of the Jews when it says, "The integrity of the upright shall guide them." But of others, who walked in perversity,  says, "but the perverseness of the treacherous shall destroy them."

Rabbi Azariah in the name of Rabbi Judah ben Rabbi Simon taught that once the Israelites said (as reported in ), "All that the Lord has spoken will we do, and obey," they left the infancy of Israel's nationhood. Rabbi Azariah in the name of Rabbi Judah ben Rabbi Simon explained in a parable. A mortal king had a daughter whom he loved exceedingly. So long as his daughter was small, he would speak with her in public or in the courtyard. When she grew up and reached puberty, the king determined that it no longer befit his daughter's dignity for him to converse with her in public. So he directed that a pavilion be made for her so that he could speak with his daughter inside the pavilion. In the same way, when God saw the Israelites in Egypt, they were in the childhood of their nationhood, as  says, "When Israel was a child, then I loved him, and out of Egypt I called My son." When God saw the Israelites at Sinai, God spoke with them as  says, "The Lord spoke with you face to face." As soon as they received the Torah, became God's nation, and said (as reported in ), "All that the Lord has spoken will we do, and obey," God observed that it was no longer in keeping with the dignity of God's children that God should converse with them in the open. So God instructed the Israelites to make a Tabernacle, and when God needed to communicate with the Israelites, God did so from the Tabernacle. And thus  bears this out when it says, "And when Moses went into the tent of meeting that He might speak with him."

Rabbi Berekiah and Rabbi Jeremiah the son of Rabbi Hiyya bar Abba said that Rabbi Levi ben Sisi gave the following exposition at Nehardea:  says, "And they saw the God of Israel; and there was under His feet the like of a brick-work of sapphire stone." This was the case before they had been redeemed (from Egyptian bondage), but when they had been redeemed the brickwork was placed where the brick was generally kept (and cast away). (Before they were redeemed God had brick-work underfoot, symbolizing the bricks to which the Israelites were enslaved, for in all Israel's troubles, God suffers too. But after their redemption, the brick-work was replaced with heaven in its purity.) Rabbi Berekiah taught that it is not written in the present context, "A brick-work of sapphire," but "The like of a brick-work of sapphire," implying that both it (the Torah, symbolized by the brick) and all the implements appertaining to it were given, including the basket and the trowel appertaining to it (symbolizing the Oral Law) were given. (The expression "like" serves to include the object compared as well as everything resembling or connected with it.) Bar Kappara said that before the Israelites were redeemed from Egypt, the brick-work under God's feet was placed as a mark in heaven, but when the Israelites were redeemed, it was seen no more in heaven. For  says, "And the like of the very heaven for clearness," implying the sky on a clear day.

It was taught in a Baraita that Rabbi Meir used to ask why  specified blue from among all the colors for the fringes. Rabbi Meir taught that it was because blue resembles the color of the sea, and the sea resembles the color of the sky, and the sky resembles the color of the Throne of Glory, as  says, "And there was under His feet as it were a paved work of sapphire stone," and  says, "The likeness of a throne as the appearance of a sapphire stone." (And thus, when one sees the blue thread of the fringe, it will help call to mind God.) And it was taught in a Baraita that Rabbi Meir used to say that the punishment for failing to observe the white threads of the fringes is greater than for failing to observe the blue threads. The Gemara illustrated this by a parable: A king gave orders to two servants. He asked one servant to bring a seal of clay, and he asked other to bring a seal of gold. And they both failed in their tasks. The Gemara argued that the servant deserving the greater punishment was the one whom the king directed to bring a seal of clay. (For clay is easier to get than gold. Thus the punishment for failing to get the simple white fringe should be greater than the penalty for failing to get the rare blue thread.)

The Midrash continued that the earlier 70 elders were consumed like Nadab and Abihu, because they too acted frivolously when (as reported in ) they beheld God and inappropriately ate and drank. The Midrash taught that Nadab, Abihu, and the 70 elders deserved to die then, but because God so loved giving the Torah, God did not wish to create disturb that time.

Rabbi Joshua son of Korchah taught that Moses stayed on Mount Sinai 40 days and 40 nights, reading the Written Law by day, and studying the Oral Law by night. After those 40 days, on the 17th of Tammuz, Moses took the Tablets of the Law, descended into the camp, broke the Tablets in pieces, and killed the Israelite sinners. Moses then spent 40 days in the camp, until he had burned the Golden Calf, ground it into powder like the dust of the earth, destroyed the idol worship from among the Israelites, and put every tribe in its place. And on the New Moon (Rosh Chodesh) of Elul (the month before Rosh Hashanah), God told Moses in  "Come up to Me on the mount," and let them sound the shofar throughout the camp, for, behold, Moses has ascended the mount, so that they do not go astray again after the worship of idols. God was exalted with that shofar, as  says, "God is exalted with a shout, the Lord with the sound of a trumpet." Therefore, the Sages instituted that the shofar should be sounded on the New Moon of Elul every year.

The Rabbis noted that  mentions that Moses appointed Aaron's nephew Hur to share the leadership of the people with Aaron, but after Moses descended from Mount Sinai, Hur's name does not appear again. Aaron though it better to let the people worship the Golden Calf, for which they might yet find forgiveness through repentance. And thus Rabbi Tanhum bar Hanilai concluded that it was in reference to Aaron's decision-making in this incident that  can be read to mean, "He who praises one who makes a compromise blasphemes God."

Rabbi Zerika asked about an apparent contradiction of Scriptural passages in the presence of Rabbi Eleazar, or, according to another version, he asked in the name of Rabbi Eleazar.  says: "And Moses entered into the midst of the cloud," whereas  reads: "And Moses was not able to enter into the tent of meeting because the cloud abode thereon." The Gemara concluded that this teaches us that God took hold of Moses and brought him into the cloud.

In medieval Jewish interpretation
The parashah is discussed in these medieval Jewish sources:

Exodus chapter 21

All of this, without trusting that the causes of health or illness will help or hurt without God's permission.

Exodus chapter 23
After reviewing the Babylonian Talmud's interpretations of  "You shall not follow a multitude to do evil," Rashi disagreed with those readings and argued that one should interpret the verse according to its context to mean that if one sees wicked people perverting justice, one should not follow them just to go with the crowd.

Nachmanides noted that  states "your enemy's" and  says "of him who hates you," while the parallel commandment in  says "your brother's." Nachmanides taught that Scripture thus means to say, "Do this for him (in assisting him), and remember the brotherhood between you and forget the hatred."

Bahya concluded that Scripture thus promises that "if you assist your enemy with his falling donkey, he will eventually appreciate you and become 'your brother.' When you assist him, he will forget the 'hatred' between you and only remember the bond of love that unites brothers."

Maimonides taught that when a person encounters a colleague on a journey and the colleague's animal has fallen under its load,  commands the person to unload the burden from it, whether or not the animal was carrying an appropriate burden for it. Maimonides interpreted  to command that one should not unload the animal and depart, leaving the wayfarer in panic, but one should lift up the animal together with its owner, and reload the animal's burden on it. Maimonides taught that the general principle is that if the animal were one's own and one would unload and reload it, one is obligated to unload and reload it for a colleague. If one is pious and goes beyond the measure of the law, even if one is a great prince, and sees an animal belonging to a colleague fallen under a load of straw, reeds or the like, one should unload and load it with its owner. Thus, one must accompany the animal for a distance thereafter, unless the owner of the burden says that it is not necessary. Maimonides read  to obligate one when one sees the fallen animal in a way that can be described as an encounter, for  says, "When you see your colleague's donkey," and  says, "When you encounter . . . ." Maimonides taught that if one finds an animal belonging to a colleague fallen under its load, it is a commandment to unload and reload it even if its owner is not present, for the words "You shall certainly help" and "You shall certainly lift up" imply that one must fulfill these commandments in all situations. Maimonides said that  says "together with him" (that is, the animal's owner) to teach that if the owner of the animal was there and goes off to the side and relies on the passerby to unload it alone because the passerby is subject to a commandment, then the passerby is not obligated. If the owner of the animal is old or ailing, however, the passerby is obligated to load and unload the animal alone.

Baḥya ibn Paquda cited  for the proposition that the relation of nature to the Torah is that of a servant to a master, and the forces of nature operate in harmony with the teaching of the Torah.

Maimonides cited  to support the proposition that it is a positive Torah commandment to pray every day, for  states: "You shall serve God, your Lord," and tradition teaches that this service is prayer, as  says, "And serve Him with all your heart," and our Sages said that the service of the heart is prayer.

Exodus chapter 24

Baḥya ibn Paquda noted that , "under His feet," implies that God has physical form and body parts. Baḥya explained that necessity brought people to anthropomorphize God and describe God in terms of human attributes so that human listeners could grasp God in their minds. After doing so, people can learn that such description was only metaphorical, and that the truth is too fine, too sublime, too exalted, and too remote from the ability and powers of human minds to grasp. Baḥya advised wise thinkers to endeavor to remove the husk of the terms and their corporeality and ascend in their minds step by step to reach the true intended meaning according to the power and ability of their minds to grasp.

In modern interpretation
The parashah is discussed in these modern sources:

Exodus chapter 21
Jacob Milgrom identified  as the Torah's oldest law code.

Explaining the origins of the law that one can see in the Cities of Refuge, Justice Oliver Wendell Holmes Jr. wrote that early forms of legal procedure were grounded in vengeance. Roman law and German law started from the blood feud, which led to the composition, at first optional, then compulsory, by which the feud was bought off. Holmes reported that in Anglo-Saxon practice, the feud was pretty well broken up by the time of William the Conqueror. The killings and house-burnings of an earlier day became the appeals of mayhem and arson, and then the legal actions now familiar to lawyers.

Dorff and Mackler reported that the Talmud read  as giving permission physicians to cure.

 reports a penalty of 30 shekels of silver. This table translates units of weight used in the Bible into their modern equivalents:

Exodus chapter 22
Benjamin Sommer taught that an ancient reader inserted a clarifying comment into .

Exodus chapter 23
 restates the law of the Sabbath. in 1950, the Committee on Jewish Law and Standards of Conservative Judaism ruled: "Refraining from the use of a motor vehicle is an important aid in the maintenance of the Sabbath spirit of repose. Such restraint aids, moreover, in keeping the members of the family together on the Sabbath. However where a family resides beyond reasonable walking distance from the synagogue, the use of a motor vehicle for the purpose of synagogue attendance shall in no wise be construed as a violation of the Sabbath but, on the contrary, such attendance shall be deemed an expression of loyalty to our faith. . . . [I]n the spirit of a living and developing Halachah responsive to the changing needs of our people, we declare it to be permitted to use electric lights on the Sabbath for the purpose of enhancing the enjoyment of the Sabbath, or reducing personal discomfort in the performance of a mitzvah."

Julius Wellhausen conceived of early Israelite religion as linked to nature's annual cycle and believed that Scripture only later connected the festivals to historical events like the Exodus from Egypt. James Kugel reported that modern scholars generally agreed that Passover reflects two originally separate holidays arising out of the annual harvest cycle. One Festival involved the sacrificing and eating of an animal from the flock, the pesa sacrifice, which arose among shepherds who sacrificed in the light of the full moon of the month that marked the vernal equinox and the end of winter (as directed in ) to bring Divine favor for a safe and prosperous summer for the rest of the flock. The shepherds slaughtered the animal at home, as the rite also stipulated that some of the animal's blood be daubed on the doorposts and lintel of the house (as directed in ) to ward off evil. The rite prescribed that no bone be broken (as directed in ) so as not to bring evil on the flock from which the sacrifice came. A second Festival—the Festival of Unleavened Bread—involved farmers eating unleavened barley bread for seven days when the winter's barley crop had reached maturity and was ready for harvest. Modern scholars believe that the absence of yeast in the bread indicated purity (as in ). Modern scholars suggest that the farmers' Festival of Unleavened Bread and the shepherds' Passover later merged into a single festival, Passover moved from the home to the Temple, and the combined festival was explicitly connected to the Exodus (as in ).

Exodus chapter 24
Fisch noted that in both cases, a father appears to issue a command, only one is called to hear the command, others stay at a distance in terror, the commandment is recorded, and the parties enter into a covenant.

Speiser argued that  refers to the Covenant Code, which  indicates was inscribed on two stone tablets and thus necessarily restricted in length.

Moshe Greenberg wrote that one may see the entire Exodus story as "the movement of the fiery manifestation of the divine presence."

Everett Fox noted that "glory" (kevod) and "stubbornness" (kaved lev) are leading words throughout the book of Exodus that give it a sense of unity.

In critical analysis
Some scholars who follow the Documentary Hypothesis find evidence of four separate sources in the parashah. Richard Elliott Friedman attributed the overwhelming majority of the parashah, to the Elohist (sometimes abbreviated E), who wrote in the north, in the land of the Tribe of Ephraim, possibly as early as the second half of the 9th century BCE. Friedman attributed  to the Priestly source, who wrote in the 6th or 5th century BCE.

Commandments
According to the Sefer ha-Chinuch, there are 23 positive and 30 negative commandments in the parashah:

To purchase a Hebrew slave in accordance with the prescribed laws
To betroth the Jewish maidservant
To redeem Jewish maidservants
The master must not sell his Jewish maidservant.
Not to withhold food, clothing, or sexual relations from one's wife
The courts must execute by strangulation those who deserve it.
Not to strike one's father or mother
The court must implement laws against the one who assaults another or damages another's property.

The court must carry out the death penalty of the sword.
The court must judge the damages incurred by a goring ox.
Not to benefit from an ox condemned to be stoned.
The court must judge the damages incurred by a pit.
The court must implement punitive measures against the thief.
The court must judge the damages incurred by an animal eating.
The court must judge the damages incurred by fire.
The courts must carry out the laws of an unpaid guard.
The courts must carry out the laws of the plaintiff, admitter, or denier.
The courts must carry out the laws of a hired worker and hired guard.
The courts must carry out the laws of a borrower.
The court must fine one who seduces a maiden.
The court must not let the sorcerer live.
Not to insult or harm a sincere convert with words
Not to cheat a sincere convert monetarily
Not to afflict any orphan or widow
To lend to the poor and destitute
Not to press them for payment if you know they don't have it
Not to intermediate in an interest loan, guarantee, witness, or write the promissory note
Not to curse judges
Not to blaspheme
Not to curse the head of state or leader of the Sanhedrin
Not to preface one tithe to the next, but separate them in their proper order
Not to eat meat of an animal that was mortally wounded
Judges must not accept testimony unless both parties are present.
Transgressors must not testify.
The court must not execute through a majority of one; at least a majority of two is required.

A judge who presented an acquittal plea must not present an argument for conviction in capital cases.
To decide by majority in case of disagreement
Not to pity a poor man in judgment
To help another remove the load from a beast which can no longer carry it
A judge must not decide unjustly the case of the habitual transgressor.
The court must not kill anybody on circumstantial evidence.
Judges must not accept bribes.
To leave free all produce that grew in the Sabbatical year
To rest on the Sabbath
Not to swear in the name of an idol
Not to turn Israelites to idolatry
To celebrate on the three Festivals of Passover, Shavuot, and Sukkot
Not to slaughter the Passover lamb while in possession of leaven
Not to leave the fat overnight
To set aside the first fruits and bring them to the Temple
Not to eat meat and milk cooked together
Not to make any treaty with the seven nations to be extirpated, or with any idol worshiper
Not to let them dwell in our land

In the liturgy
The laws of the servant in  provide an application of the tenth of the Thirteen Rules for interpreting the Torah in the Baraita of Rabbi Ishmael that many Jews read as part of the readings before the Pesukei d'Zimrah prayer service. The tenth rule provides that an item included in a generalization that is then singled out to discuss something of a kind different from the generalization is singled out to be more lenient and more stringent.  describes the laws of the Jewish indentured servant, who goes free after six years. Then  turns to the female Jewish indentured servant, who one might have thought was included in the generalization about Jewish indentured servants. Instead,  says that her avenues to freedom are not as those of her male counterpart. Rather, the Torah applies a more lenient rule to the female Jewish indentured servant, as she may go free before six years have passed—upon the onset of puberty or the death of her master. And  also applies a more stringent rule to the female Jewish indentured servant, as she may be betrothed against her will to the master or his son.

And the laws of trespass in  provide an example of the sixth of the Thirteen Rules for interpreting the Torah in the Baraita of Rabbi Ishmael. The sixth rule provides that when a generalization is followed by a specification followed by another generalization, one may not infer anything except that which is like the specification. One might read the generalizations to teach that all things are included, but the specification implies that only the specific items are included. The rule resolves the apparent contradiction by inferring that everything is included, provided it is similar to the items specified. Thus,  begins by referring to "every matter of trespass" and concludes by referring to "any manner of lost thing"—two generalizations. But between the two generalizations,  refers to a number of specific items—"for ox, for donkey, for sheep, for garment." Applying the sixth rule teaches that the fine applies to movable things with intrinsic value—like an ox, donkey, sheep, or garment—but not to immovable real estate and not to contracts, which have no intrinsic value.

Some Jews recite  three times as part of the Wayfarer's Prayer (Tefilat HaDerech), said on setting out on a journey.

The Weekly Maqam
In the Weekly Maqam, Sephardic Jews each week base the songs of the services on the content of that week's parashah. For Parashat Mishpatim, Sephardic Jews apply Maqam Saba, the maqam that symbolizes the covenant between man and God. By performing mitzvot and following commandments, one obeys God's covenant, and therefore in this parashah, with its multitude of mitzvot and commandments, Sephardi Jews apply Maqam Saba.

Haftarah

Generally

Summary
The word of the Lord came to Jeremiah after King Zedekiah made a covenant with the people of Jerusalem to proclaim liberty, that all should let their Hebrew slaves—both men and women—go free, and that none should make bondmen of them. All the princes and people listened and let their Hebrew slaves go free, but afterwards they turned and caused their servants whom they had freed to return to subjugation.

Therefore, the word of the Lord came to Jeremiah, saying that God had made a covenant with the Israelites' forefathers when God brought them out of the land of Egypt and out of the house of bondage that in the seventh year they must let every Hebrew slave go free, but their forefathers did not listen. The people had turned and done what is right in God's eyes, proclaiming liberty to their neighbors, making a covenant before God in the Temple. But the people turned again and profaned God's name, causing their servants whom they had freed to return to subjugation as servants once again. Therefore, God said that as the people had not listened to God to proclaim liberty to their neighbors, God would proclaim for the people liberty to the sword, pestilence, and famine, and would make them a horror to all the kingdoms of the earth. God would give over to their enemies the princes of Judah, the princes of Jerusalem, the officers, the priests, and all the people of the land who had transgressed God's covenant, who had sealed the covenant by cutting a calf in half and passing between the two parts of the calf, and their dead bodies would be food for scavengers. And God would give Zedekiah and his princes into the hand of the king of Babylon, who would return to burn Jerusalem and lay desolate the cities of Judah.

The Haftarah concludes by returning to  God said that as surely as God had decreed the ordinances of heaven and earth, God would not cast away the descendants of Jacob and David, but God would make from among them rulers of the descendants of Abraham, Isaac, and Jacob; for God would have compassion on them and end their captivity.

Connection to the Parashah
Both the parashah and the haftarah address the law requiring the release of Hebrew slaves. Both the parashah and the haftarah use the words "Hebrew" (ivri), "slave" or "servant" (eved), "free" (chofshi), and "covenant" (brit). The haftarah literally quotes the parashah. And the haftarah recites the setting of the parashah (described in the previous parashah), the time at which God brought the Israelites "out of the land of Egypt, out of the house of bondage."

On Shabbat Shekalim

On Shabbat Rosh Chodesh

On Shabbat Machar Chodesh

Notes

Further reading
The parashah has parallels or is discussed in these sources:

Ancient
Laws of Eshnunna 53–55. Sumer, circa 2100 BCE. In, e.g., Reuven Yaron. The Laws of Eshnunna. Brill Academic Publishers, 1997. (ox that gores).
Code of Hammurabi 194–214, 250–51. Babylonia, Circa 1780 BCE. In, e.g., James B. Pritchard. Ancient Near Eastern Texts Relating to the Old Testament, pages 175, 178. Princeton: Princeton University Press, 1969. (An eye for an eye, ox that gores).

Biblical
 (domestic animals lost to wild animals).
, 43–49 (Passover);  (Passover);  (three pilgrim festivals).
 (Passover);  (Passover, Shavuot);  (Sukkot).
 (Hebrew servant);  (three pilgrim festivals); ; ;  (Passover);  (Sukkot).
 (Passover).
 (Sukkot).
 (Sukkot);  (northern feast like Sukkot).
.
.
 (Sukkot).
.
 (Sukkot).
 (Sukkot).
 (Hebrew slaves);  (Sukkot).
 (Sukkot);  (Sukkot);  (three Pilgrim festivals).

Early nonrabbinic
John  (Sukkot).
Quran 2:275; 3:130. Arabia, 7th century. (Islam's parallel prohibition of interest, or riba).

Classical rabbinic
Mishnah: Peah 8:9; Sheviit 1:1–10:9; Terumot 3:6–7; Challah 4:10; Bikkurim 1:1–3:12; Pesachim 1:1–10:9; Sukkah 1:1–5:8; Beitzah 1:1–5:7; Rosh Hashanah 2:9; Chagigah 1:1–3; Ketubot 3:2, 5:6; Sotah 3:8; Kiddushin 1:2–3; Bava Kamma 1:1–10:10; Bava Metzia 2:10, 3:12, 4:10, 5:11, 7:8–8:3; Sanhedrin 1:1, 4, 6, 7:6, 8:6, 9:1, 11:1; Avot 5:9; Zevachim 14:2; Chullin 8:4; Bekhorot 1:7, 8:7; Arakhin 3:1, 3–4; Zavim 2:3. Land of Israel, circa 200 CE. In, e.g., Jacob Neusner, translator, The Mishnah: A New Translation, pages 36, 68–93, 99, 158, 166–75, 229–51, 279–99, 303, 328–29, 383, 388–89, 453, 487–88, 503–28, 533, 537, 540, 544, 548–51, 583–85, 598, 601–02, 607, 687, 730, 781, 790, 806, 812–13, 1111. New Haven: Yale University Press, 1988.
Tosefta: Berakhot 4:15; 6:1; Sheviit 1:1–8:11; Terumot 7:8; Bikkurim 1:1–2:16; Shabbat 15:17; Pisha (Pesachim) 1:1–10:13; Shekalim 3:24; Sukkah 1:1–4:28; Yom Tov (Beitzah) 2:12; Chagigah 1:1; Ketubot 3:7; 12:2; Nedarim 2:6; Sotah 8:7; 11:6; Bava Kamma 1:1–11:18; Bava Metzia 2:25–26; 4:2; 7:9–8:1; 8:20–21; Sanhedrin 3:2, 7; 11:5, 9; 12:3; Makkot 2:1–3:10; Shevuot 3:8; 5:2; 6:1, 3; Eduyot 1:15; Avodah Zarah 6:11; Zevachim 8:26; Chullin 8:11; Arakhin 2:10; 3:2; 5:9. Land of Israel, circa 250 CE. In, e.g., The Tosefta: Translated from the Hebrew, with a New Introduction. Translated by Jacob Neusner, volume 1, pages 25, 37, 178, 203–49, 345–53, 418, 471–522, 538, 567–84, 594, 663, 752, 778, 789, 870, 879; volume 2, pages 951–1022, 1033, 1044, 1063–66, 1071–72, 1150, 1153–54, 1183–85, 1202–08, 1233–34, 1236, 1240–41, 1250, 1285, 1347, 1397, 1499, 1501, 1514. Peabody, Massachusetts: Hendrickson Publishers, 2002.
Jerusalem Talmud: Berakhot 39a, 60a, 72b, 88a; Peah 3a, 6b, 41b, 47b, 49a, 57b, 73a; Demai 28a; Sheviit 1a–87b; Terumot 29b, 31a, 61a, 75b, 101b; Maaser Sheni 38a; Challah 47b, 48b; Orlah 33b–34b; Bikkurim 1a–26b; Shabbat 14a; Eruvin 28b, 52a; Pesachim 1a–86a; Yoma 2b; Sukkah 1a–33b; Beitzah 1a–49b; Rosh Hashanah 4a, 7b, 17a; Taanit 22b, 23b, 26a, 29a; Megillah 6a, 15b, 18b, 35a; Moed Katan 11b; Chagigah 1a–3a, 4a, 14b; Yevamot 12a, 43a, 58a–b, 69a; Ketubot 5b, 17a, 20b, 21b, 26b, 38b; Nedarim 12b; Nazir 25b–26b, 52a–53a; Sotah 19b–20a; Gittin 20b, 22a, 24b, 31b; Kiddushin 1a, 3a, 5b–6b, 7b, 8b, 9b–11a, 16a, 21a; Bava Kamma 1a, 2b–3b, 4b–5a, 8a–b, 16b, 17b–19a, 21a–b, 22b, 24b–25a, 26a–b, 30b–31a; Bava Metzia 8b–12a, 16a, 23a, 27b–29a, 33a; Bava Batra 19a; Sanhedrin 1a–b, 3b, 9a, 10b, 22a, 26b, 27b–28a, 29b, 39a, 44a–b, 45b–46a, 49a, 50a, 51a, 54a, 57b–58b; Shevuot 34b–36a, 38a–b, 39b, 45a–46a, 46b; Avodah Zarah 1a, 11a, 15a, 33b. Tiberias, Land of Israel, circa 400 CE. In, e.g., Talmud Yerushalmi. Edited by Chaim Malinowitz, Yisroel Simcha Schorr, and Mordechai Marcus, volumes 1–4, 6b–8, 10–13, 16–19, 21–31, 33, 35–36, 38–48. Brooklyn: Mesorah Publications, 2005–2020.
Mekhilta According to Rabbi Ishmael 58:1–80:2. Land of Israel, late 4th century. In, e.g., Mekhilta According to Rabbi Ishmael. Translated by Jacob Neusner, volume 2, pages 105–250. Atlanta: Scholars Press, 1988.
Midrash Tanhuma Mishpatim. 5th–10th centuries. In, e.g., The Metsudah Midrash Tanchuma: Shemos II. Translated and annotated by Avrohom Davis, edited by Yaakov Y.H. Pupko, volume 4 (Shemos volume 2), pages 1–100. Monsey, New York: Eastern Book Press, 2004.

Babylonian Talmud: Berakhot 5a, 17a, 21b, 36b, 48b, 56b, 58a, 60a; Shabbat 18a, 86b, 88a, 93b; Eruvin 51a, 54b, 65a; Pesachim 2a–121b; Yoma 2b, 3b–4b, 15b, 50a, 52b, 59a, 65a, 75a, 76a, 79a, 85a; Sukkah 2a–56b; Beitzah 2a–40b; Rosh Hashanah 11a, 13a, 25a; Taanit 28b; Megillah 15b, 31a; Moed Katan 2a–3a, 5a, 8a, 23b; Chagigah 2a, 3a, 4a–b, 6a–7a, 11a, 18a, 25a; Yevamot 4a, 5b, 7a, 22b–23a, 25a, 35a, 46b, 48b, 49b, 60a, 66b, 69b–70a, 72b, 78a, 100b–01a, 103a, 104a; Ketubot 10a, 15b, 17a, 18a, 29a–30a, 32a–34b, 36b–38b, 39b–41a, 42a–b, 44b, 46a–48a, 56a, 61b, 63a, 79b, 97b, 105a–b, 112a; Nedarim 7a, 15b, 31b–32a, 76a; Nazir 35a, 37a; Sotah 8a, 13b, 17a, 23a–b, 36a, 42b; Gittin 7a, 12b, 18a, 42a–b, 45a, 48b–49b, 51b, 65a, 77a, 88b; Kiddushin 3b–4a, 6a, 9b, 11b, 14b–15a, 16a–20a, 21b–22b, 24a–b, 30b, 34a–35a, 38a, 40a, 42b–43a, 46a, 49a, 56b, 57b–58a, 68b; Bava Kamma 2a–119b; Bava Metzia 5a–b, 10b–11a, 27a, 31a–33b, 38b–39a, 41a, 43b, 48b, 54a, 56a–b, 57b, 58b, 59b, 62a, 71a, 75b, 83a, 93a–99b, 107b, 113b, 114b; Bava Batra 4a, 23b, 28a–b, 43b, 50a, 70a, 81a, 93a, 94b, 107a, 108b, 126b, 159a; Sanhedrin 2a–b, 3b–4b, 7b, 9b, 15a–b, 17a, 18b–19a, 24b–25b, 27a, 28b, 32a, 33b, 35b–36b, 38b, 40b–41a, 43a, 47a, 52b–53a, 54b, 56a–b, 60a–b, 63a–b, 66a, 67a–b, 69a, 72a–b, 74a, 78a–79a, 80a, 83a, 84b–86a, 87b, 94a, 109a, 110b, 111b; Makkot 2b, 5a–b, 7a–13a, 18a–b, 19b, 21b, 23a; Shevuot 30b–31a, 33a, 35b, 36b, 39b, 40b, 42a–43a, 45a–b, 47a, 49a; Avodah Zarah 34b, 51a, 74a; Horayot 4b; Zevachim 24b, 38b, 66a, 69a, 70b, 82b, 97b, 115b–16a, 117a; Menachot 5b, 10a, 43b, 45a, 71a, 78b, 83b, 84b, 101b; Chullin 11a–b, 26b, 30a, 37a, 39b, 42a, 47b, 68a–b, 73b, 75a, 77a, 81a–b, 82b, 89a, 98b, 101a, 102b, 103b, 108b, 113a, 114a, 115b–16a, 120b, 131a, 134a, 137a; Bekhorot 2b, 10a, 11a, 13a, 26b, 34a, 49b, 50b–51b, 55b, 57a; Arakhin 2b, 6b–7a, 13b, 14b, 18b, 19b, 25b, 29a, 30b, 33a; Temurah 3b–4a, 25b, 30a–b; Keritot 4a, 8b–9a; Meilah 13a; Niddah 8a, 40a, 47b–48a. Sasanian Empire, 6th century. In, e.g., Talmud Bavli. Edited by Yisroel Simcha Schorr, Chaim Malinowitz, and Mordechai Marcus, 72 volumes. Brooklyn: Mesorah Publications, 2006.

Medieval
Exodus Rabbah 30:1–32:9. 10th century. In, e.g., Midrash Rabbah: Exodus. Translated by Simon M. Lehrman, volume 3, pages 346–413. London: Soncino Press, 1939.

Rashi on Exodus 21–24. Troyes, France, late 11th century. In, e.g., Yisrael Isser Zvi Herczeg. Rashi: The Torah: With Rashi's Commentary Translated, Annotated, and Elucidated, volume 2, pages 247–317. Brooklyn: Mesorah Publications, 1994.
Rashbam. Commentary on the Torah. Troyes, early 12th century. In, e.g., Rashbam's Commentary on Exodus: An Annotated Translation. Edited and translated by Martin I. Lockshin, pages 225–302. Atlanta: Scholars Press, 1997.
Judah Halevi. Kuzari. 2:14; 3:1, 35, 47; 4:3, 11. Toledo, Spain, 1130–1140. In, e.g., Jehuda Halevi. Kuzari: An Argument for the Faith of Israel. Introduction by Henry Slonimsky, pages 90, 135, 168, 175, 204, 217. New York: Schocken, 1964.
Abraham ibn Ezra. Commentary on the Torah. France, 1153. In, e.g., Ibn Ezra's Commentary on the Pentateuch: Exodus (Shemot). Translated and annotated by H. Norman Strickman and Arthur M. Silver, volume 2, pages 447–530. New York: Menorah Publishing Company, 1996.

Maimonides. Mishneh Torah, Introduction, 1. Cairo, Egypt, 1170–1180.
Maimonides. The Guide for the Perplexed. Cairo, Egypt, 1190. In, e.g., Moses Maimonides. The Guide for the Perplexed. Translated by Michael Friedländer, pages 17–19, 28, 32, 34, 37, 51, 58–59, 64, 96, 160, 163, 221, 223, 277, 315, 317, 323, 333, 339–44, 347, 353, 371, 374–75, 387. New York: Dover Publications, 1956.
Hezekiah ben Manoah. Hizkuni. France, circa 1240. In, e.g., Chizkiyahu ben Manoach. Chizkuni: Torah Commentary. Translated and annotated by Eliyahu Munk, volume 2, pages 517–74. Jerusalem: Ktav Publishers, 2013.

Nachmanides. Commentary on the Torah. Jerusalem, circa 1270. In, e.g., Ramban (Nachmanides): Commentary on the Torah. Translated by Charles B. Chavel, volume 2, pages 338–433. New York: Shilo Publishing House, 1973.
The Zohar 2:94a–126a. Spain, late 13th century. In, e.g., The Zohar. Translated by Harry Sperling and Maurice Simon. 5 volumes. London: Soncino Press, 1934.
Bahya ben Asher. Commentary on the Torah. Spain, early 14th century. In, e.g., Midrash Rabbeinu Bachya: Torah Commentary by Rabbi Bachya ben Asher. Translated and annotated by Eliyahu Munk, volume 4, pages 1122–217. Jerusalem: Lambda Publishers, 2003.
Jacob ben Asher (Baal Ha-Turim). Commentary on the Torah. Early 14th century. In, e.g., Baal Haturim Chumash: Shemos/Exodus. Translated by Eliyahu Touger, edited and annotated by Avie Gold, volume 2, pages 755–811. Brooklyn: Mesorah Publications, 2000.
Nissim of Gerona (The Ran). Derashos HaRan (Discourses of the Ran), discourse 4. Barcelona, Catalonia, 14th century. In, e.g., Yehuda Meir Keilson. Derashos HaRan: Discourses of the Ran, Rabbeinu Nissim ben Reuven of Gerona, Translated, Annotated, and Elucidated. Volume 1, pages 277–363. Brooklyn: Mesorah Publications, 2019.
Isaac ben Moses Arama. Akedat Yizhak (The Binding of Isaac). Late 15th century. In, e.g., Yitzchak Arama. Akeydat Yitzchak: Commentary of Rabbi Yitzchak Arama on the Torah. Translated and condensed by Eliyahu Munk, volume 1, pages 437–58. New York: Lambda Publishers, 2001.
Isaac Abravanel. Principles of Faith. Chapters 3, 5, 12, 17, 19. Naples, Italy, 1494. In, e.g., Isaac Abravanel. Principles of Faith (Rosh Amanah). Translated by Menachem Marc Kellner, pages 66, 76, 116, 118, 154, 171. Rutherford, New Jersey: Fairleigh Dickinson University Press, 1982.
Isaac Abravanel. Commentary on the Torah. Italy, between 1492–1509. In, e.g., Abarbanel: Selected Commentaries on the Torah: Volume 2: Shemos/Exodus. Translated and annotated by Israel Lazar, pages 258–93. Brooklyn: CreateSpace, 2015.

Modern
Abraham Saba. Ẓeror ha-Mor (Bundle of Myrrh). Fez, Morocco, circa 1500. In, e.g., Tzror Hamor: Torah Commentary by Rabbi Avraham Sabba. Translated and annotated by Eliyahu Munk, volume 3, pages 1069–100. Jerusalem, Lambda Publishers, 2008.
Obadiah ben Jacob Sforno. Commentary on the Torah. Venice, 1567. In, e.g., Sforno: Commentary on the Torah. Translation and explanatory notes by Raphael Pelcovitz, pages 394–417. Brooklyn: Mesorah Publications, 1997.

Moshe Alshich. Commentary on the Torah. Safed, circa 1593. In, e.g., Moshe Alshich. Midrash of Rabbi Moshe Alshich on the Torah. Translated and annotated by Eliyahu Munk, volume 2, pages 502–36. New York, Lambda Publishers, 2000.
Shlomo Ephraim Luntschitz. Kli Yakar. Lublin, 1602. In, e.g., Kli Yakar: Shemos. Translated by Elihu Levine, volume 2, pages 97–163. Southfield, Michigan: Targum Press/Feldheim Publishers, 2007.
Saul Levi Morteira. "The Land Shudders." Budapest, 1627. In Marc Saperstein. Exile in Amsterdam: Saul Levi Morteira's Sermons to a Congregation of "New Jews," pages 393–407. Cincinnati: Hebrew Union College Press, 2005.

Avraham Yehoshua Heschel. Commentaries on the Torah. Cracow, Poland, mid 17th century. Compiled as Chanukat HaTorah. Edited by Chanoch Henoch Erzohn. Piotrkow, Poland, 1900. In Avraham Yehoshua Heschel. Chanukas HaTorah: Mystical Insights of Rav Avraham Yehoshua Heschel on Chumash. Translated by Avraham Peretz Friedman, pages 174–83. Southfield, Michigan: Targum Press/Feldheim Publishers, 2004.
Thomas Hobbes. Leviathan, 3:40. England, 1651. Reprint edited by C. B. Macpherson, page 503. Harmondsworth, England: Penguin Classics, 1982.

Chaim ibn Attar. Ohr ha-Chaim. Venice, 1742. In Chayim ben Attar. Or Hachayim: Commentary on the Torah. Translated by Eliyahu Munk, volume 2, pages 689–753. Brooklyn: Lambda Publishers, 1999.
Moses Mendelssohn. Sefer Netivot Hashalom (The "Bi'ur," The Explanation). Berlin, 1780–1783. In Moses Mendelssohn: Writings on Judaism, Christianity, and the Bible. Edited Michah Gottlieb, pages 205–08. Waltham, Massachusetts: Brandeis University Press, 2011.

Nachman of Breslov. Teachings. Bratslav, Ukraine, before 1811. In Rebbe Nachman's Torah: Breslov Insights into the Weekly Torah Reading: Exodus-Leviticus. Compiled by Chaim Kramer, edited by Y. Hall, pages 178–212. Jerusalem: Breslov Research Institute, 2011.
Samson Raphael Hirsch. The Pentateuch: Exodus. Translated by Isaac Levy, volume 2, pages 286–427. Gateshead: Judaica Press, 2nd edition 1999. Originally published as Der Pentateuch uebersetzt und erklaert. Frankfurt, 1867–1878.

Samuel David Luzzatto (Shadal). Commentary on the Torah. Padua, 1871. In, e.g., Samuel David Luzzatto. Torah Commentary. Translated and annotated by Eliyahu Munk, volume 3, pages 769–847. New York: Lambda Publishers, 2012.
Samson Raphael Hirsch. The Jewish Sabbath. Frankfurt, before 1889. Translated by Ben Josephussoro. 1911. Reprinted Lexington, Kentucky: CreateSpace Independent Publishing Platform, 2014.
Yehudah Aryeh Leib Alter. Sefat Emet. Góra Kalwaria (Ger), Poland, before 1906. Excerpted in The Language of Truth: The Torah Commentary of Sefat Emet. Translated and interpreted by Arthur Green, pages 111–16. Philadelphia: Jewish Publication Society, 1998. Reprinted 2012.

Hermann Cohen. Religion of Reason: Out of the Sources of Judaism. Translated with an introduction by Simon Kaplan; introductory essays by Leo Strauss, pages 125–27, 145, 154, 232, 348, 422, 431, 451. New York: Ungar, 1972. Reprinted Atlanta: Scholars Press, 1995. Originally published as Religion der Vernunft aus den Quellen des Judentums. Leipzig: Gustav Fock, 1919.

H. G. Wells. "Serfs, Slaves, Social Classes and Free Individuals." In The Outline of History: Being a Plain History of Life and Mankind, pages 254–59. New York: The Macmillan Company, 1920. Revised edition Doubleday and Company, 1971.
Alexander Alan Steinbach. Sabbath Queen: Fifty-four Bible Talks to the Young Based on Each Portion of the Pentateuch, pages 54–57. New York: Behrman's Jewish Book House, 1936.
Benno Jacob. The Second Book of the Bible: Exodus. London, 1940. Translated by Walter Jacob, pages 606–757. Hoboken, New Jersey: KTAV Publishing House, 1992.

Thomas Mann. Joseph and His Brothers. Translated by John E. Woods, pages 305, 535–36. New York: Alfred A. Knopf, 2005. Originally published as Joseph und seine Brüder. Stockholm: Bermann-Fischer Verlag, 1943.
Isaac Mendelsohn. "Slavery in the Ancient Near East." Biblical Archaeologist, volume 9 (1946): pages 74–88.
Isaac Mendelsohn. Slavery in the Ancient Near East. New York: Oxford University Press, 1949.

Morris Adler, Jacob B. Agus, and Theodore Friedman. "Responsum on the Sabbath." Proceedings of the Rabbinical Assembly, volume 14 (1950), pages 112–88. New York: Rabbinical Assembly of America, 1951. In Proceedings of the Committee on Jewish Law and Standards of the Conservative Movement 1927–1970, volume 3 (Responsa), pages 1109–34. Jerusalem: The Rabbinical Assembly and The Institute of Applied Hallakhah, 1997.
Abraham Joshua Heschel. The Sabbath. New York: Farrar, Straus and Giroux, 1951. Reprinted 2005.
Abraham Joshua Heschel. Man's Quest for God: Studies in Prayer and Symbolism, page 18. New York: Charles Scribner's Sons, 1954.
Morris Adler. The World of the Talmud, pages 30, 42. B'nai B'rith Hillel Foundations, 1958. Reprinted Kessinger Publishing, 2007.

Umberto Cassuto. A Commentary on the Book of Exodus. Jerusalem, 1951. Translated by Israel Abrahams, pages 255–316. Jerusalem: The Magnes Press, The Hebrew University, 1967.
Herbert B. Huffmon. "Exodus 23:4–5: A comparative Study." In A Light unto My Path: Old Testament Studies in Honor of Jacob M. Myers. Edited by Howard N. Bream, Ralph D. Heim, and Carey A. Moore, pages 271–78. Philadelphia: Temple University Press, 1974.
Jacob Milgrom. "First fruits, OT." In The Interpreter's Dictionary of the Bible. Supp, volume, pages 336–37. Nashville, Tennessee: Abingdon, 1976.
Elie Munk. The Call of the Torah: An Anthology of Interpretation and Commentary on the Five Books of Moses. Translated by E.S. Mazer, volume 2, pages 292–361. Brooklyn: Mesorah Publications, 1995. Originally published as La Voix de la Thora. Paris: Fondation Samuel et Odette Levy, 1981.
Jacob Milgrom. "'You Shall Not Boil a Kid in Its Mother's Milk': An archaeological myth destroyed." Bible Review, volume 1, number 3 (Fall 1985): pages 48–55.
David Kader. "Torts and Torah." (1986). Journal of Law & Religion, volume 4 (1986): pages 161, 164–167.
Pinchas H. Peli. Torah Today: A Renewed Encounter with Scripture, pages 75–79. Washington, D.C.: B'nai B'rith Books, 1987.
Ben Zion Bergman. "A Question of Great Interest: May a Synagogue Issue Interest-Bearing Bonds?" New York: Rabbinical Assembly, 1988. YD 167:1.1988a. In Responsa: 1980–1990: The Committee on Jewish Law and Standards of the Conservative Movement. Edited by David J. Fine, pages 319–23. New York: Rabbinical Assembly, 2005.
Avram Israel Reisner. "Dissent: A Matter of Great Interest" New York: Rabbinical Assembly, 1988. YD 167:1.1988b. In Responsa: 1980–1990: The Committee on Jewish Law and Standards of the Conservative Movement. Edited by David J. Fine, pages 324–28. New York: Rabbinical Assembly, 2005.
Mark S. Smith. The Early History of God: Yahweh and the Other Deities in Ancient Israel, pages xx, 59, 100–01, 112, 148–49, 155, 157, 163. New York: HarperSanFrancisco, 1990.
Harvey J. Fields. A Torah Commentary for Our Times: Volume II: Exodus and Leviticus, pages 51–60. New York: UAHC Press, 1991.
Nahum M. Sarna. The JPS Torah Commentary: Exodus: The Traditional Hebrew Text with the New JPS Translation, pages 117–55, 273–76. Philadelphia: Jewish Publication Society, 1991.
Lawrence Kushner. God Was in This Place and I, I Did Not Know: Finding Self, Spirituality and Ultimate Meaning, pages 32–33. Jewish Lights Publishing, 1993. (the Place).
Nehama Leibowitz. New Studies in Shemot (Exodus), volume 2, pages 361–458. Jerusalem: Haomanim Press, 1993. Reprinted as New Studies in the Weekly Parasha. Lambda Publishers, 2010.
Aaron Wildavsky. Assimilation versus Separation: Joseph the Administrator and the Politics of Religion in Biblical Israel, pages 3–4. New Brunswick, N.J.: Transaction Publishers, 1993.
Walter Brueggemann. "The Book of Exodus." In The New Interpreter's Bible. Edited by Leander E. Keck, volume 1, pages 855–83. Nashville: Abingdon Press, 1994.
Russell Fuller. "Exodus 21:22-23: The Miscarriage Interpretation and the Personhood of the Fetus." Journal of the Evangelical Theological Society, volume 37, number 2 (June 1994): pages 169–84.
Judith S. Antonelli. "Female Servitude." In In the Image of God: A Feminist Commentary on the Torah, pages 185–202. Northvale, New Jersey: Jason Aronson, 1995.
Hayim Lapin. "Early Rabbinic Civil Law and the Literature of the Second Temple Period." Jewish Studies Quarterly, volume 2, number 2 (1995): pages 149–83. (analysis of law of deposits in ).
Hayim Lapin. Early Rabbinic Civil Law and the Social History of Roman Galilee: A Study of Mishnah Tractate Baba' Mesi'a'. Atlanta: Scholars Press, 1995. (analysis of law of deposits in ).
Jacob Milgrom. "'The Alien in Your Midst': Every nation has its ger: the permanent resident. The Torah commands us, first, not to oppress the ger, and then to befriend and love him." Bible Review, volume 11, number 6 (December 1995).
Ellen Frankel. The Five Books of Miriam: A Woman's Commentary on the Torah, pages 121–29. New York: G. P. Putnam's Sons, 1996.
Marc Gellman. "The Commandments on Moses' Sleeves." In God's Mailbox: More Stories About Stories in the Bible, pages 60–67. New York: Morrow Junior Books, 1996.

Jacob Milgrom. "Lex Talionis and the Rabbis: The Talmud reflects an uneasy rabbinic conscience toward the ancient law of talion, 'eye for eye, tooth for tooth.'" Bible Review, volume 12, number 2 (April 1996).
W. Gunther Plaut. The Haftarah Commentary, pages 179–86. New York: UAHC Press, 1996.
Sorel Goldberg Loeb and Barbara Binder Kadden. Teaching Torah: A Treasury of Insights and Activities, pages 121–27. Denver: A.R.E. Publishing, 1997.
Robert Goodman. "Shabbat" and "Pesach." In Teaching Jewish Holidays: History, Values, and Activities, pages 1–19, 153–72. Denver: A.R.E. Publishing, 1997.
Judith Hauptman. "Rape and Seduction." In Rereading The Rabbis: A Woman's Voice, pages 77–101. Boulder, Colorado: Westview Press, 1997..
Baruch J. Schwartz. "What Really Happened at Mount Sinai? Four biblical answers to one question." Bible Review, volume 13, number 5 (October 1997).
Susan Freeman. Teaching Jewish Virtues: Sacred Sources and Arts Activities, pages 255–68. Springfield, New Jersey: A.R.E. Publishing, 1999..
Exodus to Deuteronomy: A Feminist Companion to the Bible (Second Series). Edited by Athalya Brenner, pages 35–37, 39, 195. Sheffield: Sheffield Academic Press, 2000.
Nancy Fuchs-Kreimer. "What Must We Do?" In The Women's Torah Commentary: New Insights from Women Rabbis on the 54 Weekly Torah Portions. Edited by Elyse Goldstein, pages 148–53. Woodstock, Vermont: Jewish Lights Publishing, 2000.
Martin R. Hauge. The Descent from the Mountain: Narrative Patterns in Exodus 19–40. Sheffield: Journal for the Study of the Old Testament Press, 2001.
Avivah Gottlieb Zornberg. The Particulars of Rapture: Reflections on Exodus, pages 288–314. New York: Doubleday, 2001.
Lainie Blum Cogan and Judy Weiss. Teaching Haftarah: Background, Insights, and Strategies, pages 413–21. Denver: A.R.E. Publishing, 2002.
Michael Fishbane. The JPS Bible Commentary: Haftarot, pages 114–19. Philadelphia: Jewish Publication Society, 2002.
Jack M. Sasson. "Should Cheeseburgers Be Kosher? A Different Interpretation of Five Hebrew Words." Bible Review, volume 19, number 6 (December 2003): pages 40–43, 50–51.
Joseph Telushkin. The Ten Commandments of Character: Essential Advice for Living an Honorable, Ethical, Honest Life, pages 218–20, 275–78. New York: Bell Tower, 2003.
Robert Alter. The Five Books of Moses: A Translation with Commentary, pages 435–59. New York: W.W. Norton & Co., 2004.
Pamela Barmash. “Blood Feud and State Control: Differing Legal Institutions for the Remedy of Homicide During the Second and First Millennia B.C.E.” Journal of Near Eastern Studies, volume 63 (July 2004): pages 183–99.
Jeffrey H. Tigay. "Exodus." In The Jewish Study Bible. Edited by Adele Berlin and Marc Zvi Brettler, pages 152–63. New York: Oxford University Press, 2004.
Professors on the Parashah: Studies on the Weekly Torah Reading Edited by Leib Moscovitz, pages 120–34. Jerusalem: Urim Publications, 2005.
David L. Baker. "Safekeeping, Borrowing, and Rental." Journal for the Study of the Old Testament, volume 31, number 1 (September 2006): pages 27–42.
Bernard S. Jackson. Wisdom-Laws: A Study of the Mishpatim of Exodus 21:1–22:16. New York: Oxford University Press, 2006.
Hilary Lipka. Sexual Transgression in the Hebrew Bible. Sheffield Phoenix Press, 2006..
W. Gunther Plaut. The Torah: A Modern Commentary: Revised Edition. Revised edition edited by David E.S. Stern, pages 511–41. New York: Union for Reform Judaism, 2006.
William H.C. Propp. Exodus 19–40, volume 2A, pages 117–54, 185–309. New York: Anchor Bible, 2006.
Jeffrey Stackert. “Why Does Deuteronomy Legislate Cities of Refuge? Asylum in the Covenant Collection (Exodus 21:12-14) and Deuteronomy (19:1–13).” Journal of Biblical Literature, volume 125, number 1 (Spring, 2006): pages 23–49.
Suzanne A. Brody. "Watcher of the World." In Dancing in the White Spaces: The Yearly Torah Cycle and More Poems, page 80. Shelbyville, Kentucky: Wasteland Press, 2007.
Shai Cherry. "The Hebrew Slave." In Torah Through Time: Understanding Bible Commentary, from the Rabbinic Period to Modern Times, pages 101–31. Philadelphia: The Jewish Publication Society, 2007.
James L. Kugel. How To Read the Bible: A Guide to Scripture, Then and Now, pages 59, 85, 241–42, 245–46, 249, 260–79, 282, 299, 324, 360, 404, 434, 578, 669. New York: Free Press, 2007.
Hans Ausloos. "The 'Angel of YHWH' in Exod. XXIII 20–33 and Judg. II 1–5. A Clue to the 'Deuteronom(Ist)ic' Puzzle?" Vetus Testamentum, volume 58, number 1 (2008): pages 1–12.
Gloria London. "Why Milk and Meat Don't Mix: A New Explanation for a Puzzling Kosher Law." Biblical Archaeology Review, volume 34, number 6 (November/December 2008): pages 66–69.
Yosef Zvi Rimon. Shemita: From the Sources to Practical Halacha. The Toby Press, 2008.
The Torah: A Women's Commentary. Edited by Tamara Cohn Eskenazi and Andrea L. Weiss, pages 427–50. New York: URJ Press, 2008.

James A. Diamond. "Nachmanides and Rashi on the One Flesh of Conjugal Union: Lovemaking vs. Duty." Harvard Theological Review, volume 102, number 2 (April 2009): pages 193–224.
Thomas B. Dozeman. Commentary on Exodus, pages 496–568. Grand Rapids, Michigan: William B. Eerdmans Publishing Company, 2009.
David Ellenson. "Laws and Judgments as a "Bridge to a Better World": Parashat Mishpatim (Exodus 21:1–24:18)." In Torah Queeries: Weekly Commentaries on the Hebrew Bible. Edited by Gregg Drinkwater, Joshua Lesser, and David Shneer, pages 98–101. New York: New York University Press, 2009.
Reuven Hammer. Entering Torah: Prefaces to the Weekly Torah Portion, pages 107–11. New York: Gefen Publishing House, 2009.
Rebecca G.S. Idestrom. "Echoes of the Book of Exodus in Ezekiel." Journal for the Study of the Old Testament, volume 33, number 4 (June 2009): pages 489–510.
Bruce Wells. "Exodus." In Zondervan Illustrated Bible Backgrounds Commentary. Edited by John H. Walton, volume 1, pages 236–46. Grand Rapids, Michigan: Zondervan, 2009.
David P. Wright. Inventing God's Law: How the Covenant Code of the Bible Used and Revised the Laws of Hammurabi. New York: Oxford University Press, 2009.

Jonathan P. Burnside. "Exodus and Asylum: Uncovering the Relationship between Biblical Law and Narrative." Journal for the Study of the Old Testament, volume 34, number 3 (March 2010): pages 243–66..
Jonathan Sacks. Covenant & Conversation: A Weekly Reading of the Jewish Bible: Exodus: The Book of Redemption, pages 157–86. Jerusalem: Maggid Books, 2010.
Stefan Schorch. "'A Young Goat in Its Mother's Milk'? Understanding an Ancient Prohibition." Vetus Testamentum, volume 60, number 1 (2010): pages 116–30.
Jonathan P. Burnside. "A 'Missing Case' in the Biblical Laws of Homicide and Asylum?" Vetus Testamentum, volume 60, number 2 (2010): pages 288–91.
Joseph Telushkin. Hillel: If Not Now, When? pages 47–52. New York: Nextbook, Schocken, 2010. (prozbol).
Joe Lieberman and David Klinghoffer. The Gift of Rest: Rediscovering the Beauty of the Sabbath. New York: Howard Books, 2011.
William G. Dever. The Lives of Ordinary People in Ancient Israel: When Archaeology and the Bible Intersect, pages 244, 290. Grand Rapids, Michigan: William B. Eerdmans Publishing Company, 2012.

Shmuel Herzfeld. "The Eved Ivri in Culpeper, Virginia." In Fifty-Four Pick Up: Fifteen-Minute Inspirational Torah Lessons, pages 105–11. Jerusalem: Gefen Publishing House, 2012.
John Makujina. "Literary Solutions to Legal Problems: The Contribution of Exodus 2.13–14 to Exodus 21.22–23." Journal for the Study of the Old Testament, volume 37, number 2 (December 2012): pages 151–65.
Daniel S. Nevins. "The Use of Electrical and Electronic Devices on Shabbat." New York: Rabbinical Assembly, 2012.
Torah MiEtzion: New Readings in Tanach: Shemot. Edited by Ezra Bick and Yaakov Beasley, pages 289–337. Jerusalem: Maggid Books, 2012.
Alissa J. Rubin. "Painful Payment for Afghan Debt: A Daughter, 6." The New York Times. (March 31, 2013). (debt servitude).
Stephen Beard. "Britain Wants To Be Hub for Sharia Banking." Marketplace. (July 18, 2013) (adaptation to Islam's parallel prohibition on charging interest).
Amiel Ungar. "Tel Aviv and the Sabbath." The Jerusalem Report, volume 24, number 8 (July 29, 2013): page 37.

Nicholas Kristof. "When Emily Was Sold for Sex." The New York Times. (February 13, 2014): page A27. (human trafficking in our time).
Ester Bloom. "The Crazy New App For Using Your iPhone on Shabbos."  Jewniverse. (October 1, 2014).
Art Swift. "Americans: 'Eye for an Eye' Top Reason for Death Penalty." Gallup. (October 23, 2014).
Walk Free Foundation. The Global Slavery Index 2014. Australia, 2014.

Pablo Diego-Rosell and Jacqueline Joudo Larsen. "35.8 Million Adults and Children in Slavery Worldwide." Gallup. (November 17, 2014).
Barack Obama. "Address to the Nation on Immigration Reform." (November 20, 2014). Compilation of Presidential Documents. Washington, D.C.: United States Government Printing Office. (paraphrasing Exodus 22:20, "Scripture tells us that we shall not oppress a stranger, for we know the heart of a stranger—we were strangers once, too. My fellow Americans, we are and always will be a nation of immigrants. We were strangers once, too.").
Simeon Chavel. “A Kingdom of Priests and its Earthen Altars in Exodus 19–24.” Vetus Testamentum, volume 65, number 2 (2015): pages 169–222.
"The Crazy New Invention for Using Electricity on Shabbat."  Jewniverse. (April 21, 2015).
Jonathan Sacks. Lessons in Leadership: A Weekly Reading of the Jewish Bible, pages 89–92. New Milford, Connecticut: Maggid Books, 2015.
"The Hittites: Between Tradition and History." Biblical Archaeology Review, volume 42, number 2 (March/April 2016): pages 28–40, 68.
Jonathan Sacks. Essays on Ethics: A Weekly Reading of the Jewish Bible, pages 109–15. New Milford, Connecticut: Maggid Books, 2016.
Shai Held. The Heart of Torah, Volume 1: Essays on the Weekly Torah Portion: Genesis and Exodus, pages 175–83. Philadelphia: Jewish Publication Society, 2017.
Steven Levy and Sarah Levy. The JPS Rashi Discussion Torah Commentary, pages 56–58. Philadelphia: Jewish Publication Society, 2017.
Somini Sengupta. "End Marry-Your-Rapist Laws, Activists Say. Mideast Listens."
U.S. Department of State. Trafficking in Persons Report: June 2018. (slavery in the present day).
Pallant Ramsundar. “Biblical Mistranslations to 'Euphrates' and the Impact on the Borders of Israel.” American Journal of Biblical Theology (2019).

External links

Texts
Masoretic text and 1917 JPS translation
Hear the parashah chanted
Hear the parashah read in Hebrew

Commentaries

Academy for Jewish Religion, California
Academy for Jewish Religion, New York
Aish.com
Akhlah: The Jewish Children's Learning Network
Aleph Beta Academy
American Jewish University—Ziegler School of Rabbinic Studies
Anshe Emes Synagogue, Los Angeles 
Ari Goldwag
Ascent of Safed
Bar-Ilan University
Chabad.org
eparsha.com
G-dcast
The Israel Koschitzky Virtual Beit Midrash
Jewish Agency for Israel
Jewish Theological Seminary
Kabbala Online
Mechon Hadar
Miriam Aflalo
MyJewishLearning.com
Ohr Sameach
Orthodox Union
OzTorah, Torah from Australia
Oz Ve Shalom—Netivot Shalom
Pardes from Jerusalem
Professor James L. Kugel
Professor Michael Carasik
Rabbi Dov Linzer
Rabbi Fabian Werbin
Rabbi Jonathan Sacks
RabbiShimon.com
Rabbi Shlomo Riskin
Rabbi Shmuel Herzfeld
Rabbi Stan Levin
Reconstructionist Judaism 
Sephardic Institute
Shiur.com
613.org Jewish Torah Audio
Tanach Study Center
Teach613.org, Torah Education at Cherry Hill
TheTorah.com
Torah from Dixie
Torah.org
TorahVort.com
Union for Reform Judaism
United Synagogue of Conservative Judaism
What's Bothering Rashi?
Yeshivat Chovevei Torah
Yeshiva University

Weekly Torah readings in Shevat
Weekly Torah readings from Exodus